Matthew Reid (30 September 1856 – 28 August 1947) was a Scottish-born Australian politician.

Born in Ayrshire, he worked in London as a carpenter before migrating to Australia in 1887. He was active in the Carpenters' Union and was an organiser of the Australian Labour Federation from 1890. In 1893, he was elected to the Legislative Assembly of Queensland as the Labor member for Toowong. Defeated in 1896, he was elected as the member for Enoggera in 1899, serving until 1902. He served as President of the Queensland Labor Party in 1905, but left the party in 1909 to join the new Liberal Party.

In 1917, he was elected to the Australian Senate as a Nationalist Senator for Queensland. He remained a Senator until his retirement in 1934, by which time he was a member of the United Australia Party, successor to the Nationalist Party. 

Reid died in 1947, aged 90.

Personal life
Reid was a prominent Theosophist. He joined the Theosophical Society in 1908 and remained a member for the rest of his life, leaving a bequest to the society's Brisbane branch. He gave public lectures on Theosophy and was influenced by Annie Besant,  teaching a class on her Study in Consciousness and helping facilitate her entry into Australia in 1922.

References

 

Australian Labor Party members of the Parliament of Queensland
Commonwealth Liberal Party members of the Parliament of Australia
Nationalist Party of Australia members of the Parliament of Australia
United Australia Party members of the Parliament of Australia
Members of the Australian Senate for Queensland
Members of the Australian Senate
Australian carpenters
1856 births
1947 deaths
20th-century Australian politicians
Scottish emigrants to colonial Australia
Members of the Queensland Legislative Assembly
Australian Theosophists